O. victoriae may refer to:

 Odostomia victoriae, a sea snail
 Ornithoptera victoriae (Queen Victoria's birdwing), a butterfly found in the Solomon Islands and Papua New Guinea
 Ophionotus victoriae, a brittle star